Avi Yashchin is an American businessman and entrepreneur. He founded CleanEdison, a New York-based green-jobs vocational education company, in 2008. One of the main purposes of the company is to provide clean innovation solutions to underserved areas. Yashchin is currently an Instructor with General Assembly, and has previously worked for Barclay's Capital and Lehman Brothers. He received his MBA from the Stern School of Business at New York University.

References

New York University Stern School of Business alumni
Technology company founders
Living people
Year of birth missing (living people)